The voyageur dollar is a coin of Canada that was struck for circulation from 1935 through 1986. Until 1968, the coin was composed of 80% silver. A smaller, nickel version for general circulation was struck from 1968 through 1986. In 1987, the coin was replaced by the loonie. However, like all of Canada's discontinued coins, the voyageur dollar coins remain legal tender.

History

Production
On May 4, 1910, the Canadian government passed an amendment to the Currency Act (Bill 195) which, among other things, called for the requirement of a Canadian silver dollar. James Bonar, Deputy Master of the Royal Mint, had ordered the master dies for this new dollar on November 10, 1910. Production of the dies was delayed, and they were not delivered to the Mint until nearly a year later. By the time the dies arrived, Sir Robert Borden had won his Canadian election, and cancelled the production of the silver dollar. While no official reason was given from the Borden government about the cancellation, a letter from Bonar attributes the coin's removal to the absence of a reference to God, which created controversy among Canadians at the time. The obverse dies, featuring the bust of King George V, would still be preserved until 1936, used with the first silver dollars to enter circulation. However, three trial strikes of silver dollars were produced in 1911 by the Royal Mint in London: two struck in silver, and one in lead. One of the silver coins, owned by the Royal Mint Museum, has been loaned to the Bank of Canada since 1976, while the lead coin was discovered during a move in 1977. The two were put into the National Currency Collection of the Bank of Canada, and have been on display in the Bank of Canada Museum since 1980.

Silver Jubilee
 In 1935, a commemorative silver dollar was struck for King George V's Silver Jubilee.  It showed the King on the obverse (front) and, a canoe containing a voyageur, (French-Canadian fur trader) and an Indigenous man, on the reverse (back).  The canoe also contains two bundles of furs—on one, the initials HB, for Hudson's Bay Company may be seen.  The reverse was designed by Emanuel Hahn. This coin marked the beginning of silver Canadian dollars in circulation, which continued until 1968, when the coin's composition shifted from silver to nickel.

Struck in silver
The issue was generally considered a success, and beginning in 1936, the silver dollar (in .800 fine silver) was struck more-or-less annually as a regular issue for general circulation, with the same reverse design as in 1935.  Although commemorative dollars were struck for circulation for the visit of King George VI in 1939, no regular-issue dollars were struck that year, as well as until the end of World War II in 1945.  Thereafter, voyageur dollars were struck each year through 1966, except in years when a commemorative dollar was struck for circulation (e.g. 1939, 1949). In 1967, a special "flying goose" design was struck for the Canadian Centennial.

Struck in nickel
Beginning in 1968, following the 1967 Canadian Centennial series, the voyageur dollar design resumed.  It was now struck in pure nickel, following the decision to debase Canada's coinage from silver to nickel.  The change to this harder metal lead to the diameter of the coin being reduced from 36 mm to 32 mm, as it made minting considerably easier.  From then on, the series was only interrupted for circulating commemorative issues, except for those produced in 1982 (Constitution Acts dollar) and 1984 (Jacques Cartier dollar), where the voyageur design was also produced.  It was last struck for circulation in 1986 and for collectors in 1987.

Change to the loonie
Neither the silver nor nickel dollars circulated well. However, the Royal Canadian Mint (RCM) saw a need for a circulating dollar coin. Since a one dollar coin could last 20 years longer than a one dollar bill, they calculated that they could save up to $250 million in 20 years. To encourage circulation, the size was reduced, the colour was changed, and the one-dollar note was eliminated from circulation.

Originally, the plans called for the voyageur design to be continued on the new gold-coloured dollar coin. However, the set of dies depicting the design was lost in transit. To eliminate the risk of counterfeiting, an alternate design submitted by Robert-Ralph Carmichael in a 1978 coin design contest, featuring a loon, was used. This became known as the loonie.

Commemorative editions
In 2003, in special proof sets honouring the fiftieth anniversary of the coronation of Queen Elizabeth II, the voyageur design was struck again in sterling silver in a limited edition of 30,000.
In 2017, the RCM issued special edition one-dollar coins in silver and gold with platinum plating to commemorate the 30th anniversary of the introduction of the loonie, with one of the coins utilizing its design, intended as a new version for the current dollar coin, but bearing the dual dates "1987–2017".

In 2018, the RCM issued  and 1 kg special-edition one-dollar fine-silver voyageur coins with gold plating. The latter is 102 mm in diameter and limited to 350 coins.

References

Commemorative coins of Canada
Coins of Canada
One-base-unit coins
Ships on coins